is a Japanese children's novel series, written by Satoko Narita and illustrated by Senno Enaga. Poplar Publishing have published seventeen volumes and one short story volume since October 2006 under their Poplar Pocket Bunko imprint. An anime film adaptation by Production I.G titled Rakudai Majo: Fūka to Yami no Majo will open in Japan in March 2023.

Characters

Media

Novels

Anime film
An anime film adaptation was announced on October 10, 2021. The film, titled Rakudai Majo: Fūka to Yami no Majo, is animated by Production I.G and directed by Takayuki Hamana, with Kiyoko Yoshimura overseeing the scripts, Marumi Sugita designing the characters, and Shun Narita and Yasuyuki Yamazaki composing the music. It will open in Japan on March 31, 2023.

Reception
The novel series has a cumulative 1.6 million copies in print.

References

External links
 
 

2006 Japanese novels
Anime and manga based on novels
Book series introduced in 2006
Fantasy anime and manga
Japanese fantasy novels
Japanese children's novels
Production I.G
Witchcraft in anime and manga
Witchcraft in written fiction